The Professional Footballers Australia (PFA), formerly the Australian Soccer Players' Association, is an Australian trade union affiliated with the Australian Council of Trade Unions that represents professional male, female and elite junior soccer players.

History
Before the PFA, eight previous attempts had been made to form a footballers' association in Australia. The PFA was formed in April 1993 as the Australian Soccer Players' Association.

In 1994 the PFA won a standardised contract for footballers, and through the Australian Industrial Relations Commission won the abolition of a transfer system much hated by Australian footballers.

Since the mid-1990s, the PFA has been active in advancing soccer players' pay and conditions, and has also been active in protecting soccer player's from unfair dismissal. It is a member of FIFPro.

Awards

The PFA holds an annual award ceremony, which formally recognises the most outstanding Australian footballers.

See also

 Soccer in Australia
 Football Federation Australia

References

External links
 

Trade unions in Australia
 
Association football trade unions
Trade unions established in 1993
1993 establishments in Australia
Association football player non-biographical articles